Otocinclus caxarari is a species of catfish in the family Loricariidae. It is native to South America, where it occurs in the Madeira River basin in Bolivia and Brazil. It is known to reach 2.6 cm (1 inch) in standard length.

References 

Hypoptopomatini
Fish described in 1997
Fauna of South America